The Blake Plateau lies in the western Atlantic Ocean off the southeastern United States coasts of North Carolina, South Carolina, Georgia and Florida. The Blake Plateau, associated Blake Ridge and Blake Basin are named for the U.S. Coast and Geodetic Survey steamer , in service 1874–1905, that first used steel cable for oceanographic operations and pioneered deep ocean and Gulf Stream exploration. Survey lines of the steamer George S. Blake first defined the plateau that now bears the ship's name.

History 
In July 1880 George S. Blake under the command of Commander John R. Bartlett, U.S.N., was working with sounding gear designed by Lieutenant Commander Sigsbee in cooperation with Alexander Agassiz collecting biological samples and examining the Gulf Stream running eastward from Cape Romain when, in taking frequent soundings eastward, "depths on this line were unexpectedly small, the axis of the Gulf Stream being crossed before a depth of three hundred fathoms ( was found" with a bottom of "hard coral" and little life. This was early indication of the plateau that would in the future carry the ship's name. In 1882 Commander Bartlett described the plateau:

Bartlett reported the scouring effect of the current on the plateau, noting that on each side of the current the sounding cylinder, a device for sampling the nature of the bottom with the sounding, brought up ooze. Within the current the "bottom was washed nearly bare", with particles being small and broken pieces of coral rock and so hard the sharp edge of the brass cylinder was bent.

Characteristics

Geology 

Due to unusual features of the plateau, particularly scouring by the Florida Current and the Antilles Current that merge over the plateau to form the Gulf Stream, mineral deposits, particularly manganese nodules, have long been of interest. Methane and other gas hydrates are also found on the plateau.

Biology 

The Blake Plateau, although described as a "bleak, current-swept plain," has biological communities including Lophelia pertusa reefs that support communities  as well as communities supported by gas hydrates. Commercial fishermen have begun exploiting deep sea fish on the plateau with studies being undertaken on the viability as these fish, although large, grow slowly. Biological sampling of the deep, hard bottom is difficult under the Gulf Stream with the consequence that the fauna is relatively poorly known.

See also 
 National Geospatial Intelligence Agency: Undersea Features History

Notes

References

External links 
 Blake Plateau features (NOAA)
 U.S. Geological Survey GLORIA Mapping Program, USGS Coastal and Marine Geology Program, U.S. EEZ Atlantic Continental Margin GLORIA, GLORIA Geology Interpretation (See Blake Plateau)

Plateaus of the Atlantic Ocean
Marine geology